Mark Steven Evitts is an American composer, producer, string arranger, and multi-instrumentalist (including violin/fiddle, viola, mandolin, guitar and piano). Evitts has worked with such artists as Nas, Hit-Boy, G Herbo, David Guetta, Cheat Codes (DJs), Train, Blues Traveler, Jewel, Rodney Atkins, The Band Perry, Secondhand Serenade, Katharine McPhee, Drew Seeley, Jaida Dreyer, We The Kings, among many others. In 2021, Mark was a co-writer on the Nas (feat. Blxst) single, "Brunch on Sundays" for the Grammy nominated rap album, King's Disease II. Evitts also recorded on Joey + Rory's RIAA certified Gold selling album, "Hymns", which earned Evitts two Grammy winning certificates for string arranging and violin/viola performance, as well as working with producers Sam Hollander and Josh Edmondson (songwriter) on ten episodes of NBC's SMASH, including the Emmy nominated original song, "I Heard Your Voice In A Dream", and on 2015's Summer Forever soundtrack, distributed by Disney Music Group. Mark also arranged and recorded strings on the Cheat Codes track, "Shed a Light (Acoustic Version)".

He has been an arranger, musician and music producer on several hit television shows, including The Bachelor, Nashville, Blood & Oil, the BBC documentary, "Love In A Day", Discovering Lucy Angel, SVT's award winner documentary series Jills veranda, as well as films such as Changeover, Summer Forever, and Finding Your Feet. Mark co-wrote additional music with film composer Alex Geringas on the Netflix Animation feature film Arlo the Alligator Boy.

In addition to his original compositions and arranging, Mark is currently part of the band, St. Alban. The trio consists of Mark, Peter McVeigh of Belfast, Northern Ireland, and Andy Dunlop (guitarist for Travis) of Glasgow, Scotland. Their self-titled debut album was BBC Radio's Album of the Week.

Early career
A Kentucky-native, Evitts began his classical music training at age twelve with the Concertmaster of the Paducah Symphony Orchestra. In 2006, Evitts began touring with the band Scarlet Kings (previously Oval Opus) until 2009. In 2010, Evitts ventured into film as the musical director and producer for the documentary Newport.

Recording Credits

Selected Discography

Selected Film and Television

Tours

References

10.Sängerin veröffentlicht neue Single "One In A Million"
11. It turns Nashville
12. Lisa-Marie Fischer: Ein Talent geht seinen Weg
 Biography on markevitts.com

External links
 
 

Musicians from Paducah, Kentucky
Bluegrass musicians from Kentucky
American mandolinists
Living people
Murray State University alumni
1981 births
American fiddlers
Songwriters from Kentucky
Guitarists from Kentucky
Country musicians from Kentucky
21st-century American guitarists
21st-century American violinists